Pangarap na Bituin (/) is a 2007 Philippine drama television series starring Sarah Geronimo, Rica Peralejo and Maja Salvador. The series aired on ABS-CBN's Primetime Bida evening block and worldwide via The Filipino Channel from September 3, 2007, to December 7, 2007, replacing Walang Kapalit. and was replaced by Maging Sino Ka Man: Ang Pagbabalik. 

The series is streaming online on YouTube.

Synopsis
The Jewel Sisters are a singing pop trio who will walk the royal yet sometimes rocky road to fame. After the tragedy that left their biological parents seemingly dead, Sapphire, Emerald, and Ruby are accidentally separated from one another. But one dream will make their paths cross, and together, they will make music that fans all over the country will deeply adore.

At first, they will all think that their love for one another as sisters will see them through the challenging life as celebrities. But little did they know that there is more to dream than the wealth and glory. Sapphire is willing to do whatever it takes to get ahead and be with Terrence Rodriguez. Emerald falls in love with Terrence, but the manipulative manager Alberta will stand against their love. Emerald and Terrence secretly becomes an item without anyone knowing except for Cocoy, Emerald's adoptive father. Ruby will battle with her own insecurities to gain the self-esteem she needs.

Later Bridgette Ramirez revealed the real Sapphire Gomez and the real Mother of the Jewel Sisters.  Bridgette also finds out that her father died because of Lena, the impostor mother of the three. After these incidents, the Jewel Sisters, together with their mother Jade Gomez, planned to have a concert. This concert is their happiest moment together as a family and Ruby and Jeffrey becomes a couple, while Alberta Tuazon apologized to her husband.

Cast and characters

Main cast

Extended cast

Production
The drama was loosely based on 1986 film Sana'y Wala Nang Wakas and was going to feature Rachelle Ann Go and Yeng Constantino with Sarah Geronimo as Sharon Cuneta's character however changes were made to fit the storyline with Maja Salvador and Rica Peralejo replacing Go and Constantino.

Reception
The pilot episode garnered a total rating of 27% according to AGB Nielsen in Mega Manila. Its lowest was 20.6% while the highest was its final episode which garnered 29.6% Its finale reached 40.3% in the Nationwide ratings (NUTAM).

Soundtrack

Track listing

See also
 List of telenovelas of ABS-CBN
 List of shows previously aired by ABS-CBN

References

External links

Pangarap na Bituin OST Philippine Release Star Records
Pangarap na Bituin OST International Release Titik Pilipino
Pangarap na Bituin Teleserye on Demand

ABS-CBN drama series
Television series by Dreamscape Entertainment Television
2007 Philippine television series debuts
2007 Philippine television series endings
Philippine musical television series
Filipino-language television shows
Television shows set in the Philippines